Machutadze was a Georgian noble family known from 1412/1442 in the Principality of Guria where they served as Mayors of the Palace at the Gurieli court. Under the Russian rule, the family was received among the knyaz of the Russian Empire in 1850.

References 

Noble families of Georgia (country)
Russian noble families
Georgian-language surnames